Mount Griffin Provincial Park is a provincial park in British Columbia, Canada, located southwest of Three Valley Gap (Eagle Pass).

References
BC Parks webpage

Monashee Mountains
Provincial parks of British Columbia
Parks in the Shuswap Country
2001 establishments in British Columbia
Protected areas established in 2001